Johannes Grenzfurthner (born 1975 in Vienna) is an Austrian artist, filmmaker, writer, actor, curator, theatre director, performer and lecturer. Grenzfurthner is the founder, conceiver and artistic director of monochrom, an international art and theory group and film production company. Most of his artworks are labeled monochrom.

Grenzfurthner is an outspoken researcher in subversive and underground culture, for example the field of sexuality and technology, and one of the founders of "techno-hedonism".

Boing Boing magazine referred to Grenzfurthner as leitnerd, a wordplay with the German term Leitkultur that ironically hints at Grenzfurthner's role in nerd/hacker/art culture.

Career 
In the early 1990s, Grenzfurthner was a member of several BBS message boards. Grenzfurther  used his online connections to create monochrom, a zine or alternative magazine that dealt with art, technology and subversive cultures. His motivation was to react to the emerging conservativism in cyber-cultures of the early 1990s, and to combine his political background in the Austrian punk and antifa movement with discussion of new technologies and the cultures they create. The publication featured interviews and essays, by e.g. Bruce Sterling, HR Giger,  Eric Drexler, Terry Pratchett and Bob Black, in its experimental layout style. In 1995 the group decided to cover new artistic practices and started experimenting with different media: computer games, robots, puppet theater, musical, short films, pranks, conferences, online activism, which Grenzfurthner calls 'Urban Hacking' or more specific: 'Context hacking', a term that Grenzfurthner coined.

Context hacking transfers the hackers' objectives and methods to the network of social relationships in which artistic production occurs, and upon which it is dependent. In a metaphoric sense, these relationships also have a source code. Programs run in them, and our interaction with them is structured by a user interface. When we know how a space, a niche, a scene, a subculture or a media or political practice functions, we can change it and "recode" it, deconstructing its power relationships and emancipating ourselves from its compulsions and packaging guidelines.

The group is known for working with different media, art and entertainment formats. Grenzfurthner calls this "looking for the best weapon of mass distribution of an idea".

Conferences and festivals 

Grenzfurthner is head of the Arse Elektronika festival in San Francisco (2007), an annual academic and artistic conference and anthology series that focusses on sexuality and technology. The first conference was curated by Grenzfurthner in 2007 to answer questions about the impact of sexuality on technological innovation and adoption.

Grenzfurthner is hosting Roboexotica, the international Festival for Cocktail-Robotics (2002–) which invites researchers and artists to build machines that serve or mix cocktails. V. Vale calls Roboexotica "an ironic attempt to criticize techno-triumphalism and to dissect technological hypes."

Grenzfurthner is head of Hedonistika, a festival for artistic food tech and robotic indulgement. The festival took place in Montréal at the 2014 'Biennale internationale d'art numérique', in Holon, near Tel Aviv at 'Print Screen Festival', and in Linz at Ars Electronica 2022.

Theatre work, performance art 
Grenzfurthner wrote and directed theatre plays and pieces of performance (e.g. Eignblunzn) and interventionist art.

Film 
Grenzfurther is the CEO of film production company monochrom Propulsion Systems. He is member of the Austrian Director's Guild and the Association of Austrian Documentary Filmmakers.

He wrote and directed shorts and feature films. His first feature film was the independent fantasy-comedy Die Gstettensaga: The Rise of Echsenfriedl (2014). Grenzfurther first feature documentary was Traceroute (2016), followed by Glossary of Broken Dreams (2018).
His horror feature Masking Threshold was premiered at Fantastic Fest in September 2021 and was released by Drafthouse Films.

His horror film Razzennest had its premiere at Fantastic Fest 2022.

Grenzfurther is developing several feature films, for example, his documentary feature Hacking at Leaves.

Grenzfurthner teamed up with Juliana Neuhuber to create the sci-fi feature comedy Je Suis Auto (featuring Chase Masterson).

Academia, writing, lecturing 
Grenzfurthner lectures at art institutions, symposions and political events, teaches at universities and mentors students.

He has published books, essays and articles on politics, contemporary art, communication processes and philosophy including Mind and Matter: Comparative Approaches Towards Complexity, Do androids sleep with electric sheep?, Of Intercourse and Intracourse: Sexuality, Biomodification and the Techno-Social Sphere and Pr0nnovation?: Pornography and Technological Innovation.

Grenzfurthner published the much debated pamphlet "Hacking the Spaces", that dealt with exclusionist tendencies in the hackerspaces movement. Grenzfurther extended his critique through lectures at the 2012 and 2014 Hackers on Planet Earth conferences in New York City.

2020 through 2021, he was editor-in-chief of the print and online magazine The Free Lunch.

Entertainment and acting 
Grenzfurthner has taken a comedic turn and performed at various venues, e.g. Vienna's Rabenhof Theater. Parts of his comedy show "Schicksalsjahre eines Nerds" form the basis of his documentary film Traceroute (2016). Grenzfurther is a presenter and emcee for various industry events, and guest performer at events like Goldenes Brett. Grenzfurthner has had supporting and lead parts in several theater plays. He performs in Andi Haller's feature film Zero Crash and Michael J. Epstein's and Sophia Cacciola's feature film Clickbait and Umbilicus desidero. He portrays one of the two lead characters in his own film Je Suis Auto.

Grenzfurthner voice acted director Fritz Lang in Karina Longworth's Vanity Fair podcast Love Is a Crime (together with Zooey Deschanel and Jon Hamm).

Community work 
Grenzfurthner was one of the core team members in the development process of netznetz, a new kind of community-based funding system for net culture and net art together with the culture department of the city government of Vienna.

He started the "Hackbus" community.

Together with Florian Hufsky, Leo Findeisen and Juxi Leitner, Grenzfurthner co-organized the first international conference of the pirate parties.

Commercial work 
Grenzfurthner conceptualized and co-built a robot installation to promote the products of sex toy company Bad Dragon. He created an artistic online ad campaign for Cheetos.

Personal life 

Grenzfurthner lives and works in Vienna. Grenzfurther grew up in Stockerau in rural Lower Austria and talks about it in his stand-up comedy "Schicksalsjahre eines Nerds" (2014) and his semi-autobiographical documentary film Traceroute (2016).

If I had not grown up in Stockerau, in the boonies of Lower Austria, than I would not be what I am now. The germ cell of burgeoning nerdism is difference. The yearning to be understood, to find opportunities to share experiences, to not be left alone with one's bizarre interest. At the same time one derives an almost perverse pleasure from wallowing in this deficit. Nerds love deficiency: that of the other, but also their own. Nerds are eager explorers, who enjoy measuring themselves against one another and also compete aggressively. And yet the nerd's existence also comprises an element of the occult, of mystery. The way in which this power is expressed or focused is very important.

Grenzfurthner uses his personal history and upbringing as a source for his work. In a conversation with Zebrabutter he names the example that he wanted to deal with his claustrophobia, so he started a series of art performances where volunteers can be buried alive.

As a child, Grenzfurthner spent a lot of time at his grandparents' farm in the small village of Unterzögersdorf (a cadastral municipality of Stockerau). His grandparents' stories about Nazism, World War II and the Soviet occupation in allied-occupied Austria (1945–1955) influenced monochrom's long-term project Soviet Unterzoegersdorf.

Controversy 
Grenzfurthner's name was one of 200 activists, politicians, and artists from Germany, Switzerland and Austria (only one of a total of 10 Austrian names) that were published on an ultra-right doxing list distributed on a variety of online platforms in December 2018 and January 2019. The list's extremist creators threatened "#wirkriegeneuchallee" (sic!) – "We will get you all". Grenzfurthner openly addressed this on online platforms and in lectures.

An artistic fake image posted by Grenzfurthner in July 2021 on his Twitter account sparked some controversy on social media and in the news.

Jean Peters reports in his book "Wenn die Hoffnung stirbt, geht's trotzdem weiter" (2021, translation from German) about a special form of anti-fascist prank Grenzfurthner staged:
Austrian artist Johannes Grenzfurthner, who himself has also published on context hacking, mingled in disguise with a Nazi demonstration in Bavaria in the spring of 2005. When cameras passed by, he made the forbidden Hitler salute. When he started doing so, the dam quickly broke; everyone around him joined in. In doing so, he had created media images showing the group as it really was. It turned bizarre when a few of them then approached him and said, "Stop, stop!" which, coming from a Nazi, sounded like a performative peculiarity, "we're not allowed to do that here." Whether over-affirmation or mimicry, the point is to make truly visible what would rather remain hidden behind a facade of self-righteousness.

Awards 
 Won (as director of "Udo 77") Nestroy Theatre Prize (2005).
 Won Coke Light Art Edition Award (2006).
 Won (as the artistic director of monochrom) the Art Award of the FWF Austrian Science Fund (2013).

Filmography (Features) 

Hacking at Leaves (to be released 2023) – director, writer, producer, actor
Je Suis Auto (to be released 2023) – director, writer, producer, actor
Razzennest (to be released 2022) – director, writer, producer
Masking Threshold (2021) – director, writer, producer, actor
The Transformations of the Transformations of the Drs. Jenkins (2021) – segment director, actor
Avenues (2019) – producer
Zweite Tür Rechts (2019) – producer, actor
Glossary of Broken Dreams (2018) – director, writer, producer, actor
Clickbait (2018) – actor
Traceroute (2016) – director, writer, producer, host
Shingal, where are you? (2016) – associate producer
Valossn (2016) – associate producer
Zero Crash (2016) – actor
Die Gstettensaga: The Rise of Echsenfriedl (2014) – director, writer, producer
Kiki and Bubu: Rated R Us (2011) – director, writer

Theater (examples)
Udo 77 (Rabenhof Theater, Vienna, 2004/2005) – director, actor, writer
Waiting for Goto (Volkstheater, Vienna, 2006) – director, writer
Campaign (Volkstheater, Vienna, 2006) – director, performer, writer
monochrom's ISS (Garage X, Vienna and Ballhaus Ost, Berlin, 2011 and 2012) – director, actor, writer
Schicksalsjahre eines Nerds (Rabenhof Theater, Vienna, 2014) – director, performer, writer
Steppenrot (komm.st, Styria and Theater Spektakel, Vienna, 2017) – director, actor, writer
Die Hansi Halleluja Show (komm.st, Styria and Theater Spektakel, Vienna, 2018–2019) – director, actor, writer
Das scharlachrote Kraftfeld (komm.st, Styria and Theater Spektakel, Vienna, 2019–2020) – director, actor, writer

Music (examples)
Carefully Selected Moments (album, Trost Records, 2008)

Publications 
 Editor of magazine/yearbook series "monochrom" (1993, 1994, 1995, 1996, 1997, 1998, 2000, 2004, 2006, 2007, 2010)
 Editor of "Stadt der Klage" (Michael Marrak, 1997)
 Editor of "Weg der Engel" (Michael Marrak and Agus Chuadar, 1998)
 Editor of "Who shot Immanence?" (together with Thomas Edlinger and Fritz Ostermayer, 2002)
 Editor of "Leutezeichnungen" (together with Elffriede, 2003)
 Editor of "Quo Vadis, Logo?!" (together with Günther Friesinger, 2006)
 Editor of "Spektakel – Kunst – Gesellschaft" (together with Stephan Grigat and Günther Friesinger, 2006)
 Editor of "pr0nnotivation? Arse Elektronika Anthology" (together with Günther Friesinger and Daniel Fabry, 2008)
 Editor of "Roboexotica" (together with Günther Friesinger, Magnus Wurzer, Franz Ablinger and Chris Veigl, 2008)
 Editor of "Do Androids Sleep with Electric Sheep?" (together with Günther Friesinger, Daniel Fabry and Thomas Ballhausen, 2009)
 Editor of "Schutzverletzungen/Legitimation of Mediatic Violence" (together with Günther Friesinger and Thomas Ballhausen, 2010)
 Editor of "Urban Hacking" (together with Günther Friesinger and Thomas Ballhausen, 2010)
 Editor of "Geist in der Maschine. Medien, Prozesse und Räume der Kybernetik" (together with Günther Friesinger, Thomas Ballhausen, Verena Bauer, 2010)
 Editor of "The Wonderful World of Absence" (together with Günther Friesinger and Daniel Fabry, 2011)
 Editor of "Of Intercourse and Intracourse – Sexuality, Biomodification and the Techno-Social Sphere" (together with Günther Friesinger and Daniel Fabry, 2011)
 Editor of "Context Hacking: How to Mess with Art, Media, Law and the Market" (together with Günther Friesinger and Frank Apunkt Schneider, 2013)
 Editor of "Screw The System – Explorations of Spaces, Games and Politics through Sexuality and Technology" (together with Günther Friesinger and Daniel Fabry, 2013)
 Editor of Subvert Subversion. Politischer Widerstand als kulturelle Praxis (together with Günther Friesinger, 2020)

References

External links 

 

1975 births
Living people
21st-century Austrian male writers
Austrian artists
Austrian bloggers
Austrian contemporary artists
Austrian art curators
Austrian theatre directors
Austrian film directors
Austrian documentary filmmakers
Austrian screenwriters
Austrian male screenwriters
Film people from Vienna
English-language film directors
Writers from Vienna
21st-century Austrian artists
People from Stockerau
Creative Commons-licensed authors
Male bloggers
21st-century screenwriters
Theatre people from Vienna